The 1929–30 Scottish Districts season is a record of all the rugby union matches for Scotland's district teams.

History

Glasgow District beat Edinburgh District in the Inter-City match.

The combined North and South district were to play the Anglo-Scots on 21 December 1929.

Results

Inter-City

Glasgow District:

Edinburgh District:

Other Scottish matches

Anglo-Scots:

Provinces District:

English matches

No other District matches played.

International matches

No touring matches this season.

References

1929–30 in Scottish rugby union
Scottish Districts seasons